Why Wouldn't We Send a Messenger? is a 1998 Russian road comedy-drama film directed by Valeri Chikov.

Plot 
The film tells about a devastated farmer who travels to the capital to the president to find out the truth. On the way, he manages to save the businessman, help the loving soldier and the elderly.

Cast 
 Mikhail Evdokimov as Ivan
 Lev Durov as Yakov
 Sasha Komkov as Sasha
 Irina Rozanova
 Nikolay Trofimov as Old man with a coffin
 Lyubov Sokolova
 Igor Yasulovich as Mad man
 Ivan Bortnik as Brother-in-law
 Georgi Grechko as Self
 Leonid Yakubovich as Self

References

External links 
 

1998 films
1990s Russian-language films
Russian road comedy-drama films
Cultural depictions of Boris Yeltsin
1990s road comedy-drama films